Michael Kuonen (born 10 June 1991) is a Swiss bobsledder. He competed in the two-man event at the 2018 Winter Olympics.

References

1991 births
Living people
Swiss male bobsledders
Olympic bobsledders of Switzerland
Bobsledders at the 2018 Winter Olympics
Place of birth missing (living people)
21st-century Swiss people